Eucereon irrorata is a moth of the subfamily Arctiinae. It was described by Schaus in 1904. It is found on Cuba.

References

 Natural History Museum Lepidoptera generic names catalog

irrorata
Moths described in 1904
Endemic fauna of Cuba